CoolSpeech is a proprietary text-to-speech program for Microsoft Windows platform, developed by ByteCool Software Inc, founded in February 2001. CoolSpeech controls text-to-speech engines compliant with Microsoft Speech API to fetch and read aloud text from a variety of sources, including websites, email accounts, local text documents (.txt, .rtf, .htm/html), the Windows Clipboard, keyboard input from anywhere in Windows, and the current date and time. It can also bookmark a text source to be read aloud periodically or on-demand.

Features 
 Listen to online news from any URL specified by the user.
 Read local text files, rich-text files and HTML files aloud.
 Convert a given piece of text into a spoken wave file (.wav).
 Listen to new messages from POP3 email accounts specified by the user.
 Listen to every word or sentence the user has just typed anywhere in Windows.
 Listen to text copied to the Windows Clipboard immediately.
 Schedule files, URLs and emails to be read aloud.
 Tell the current time and the date in different styles.
 Support all Microsoft Speech API 4.0-compliant voices.

Awards 
 ZDNet "Hot File of the Day" on January 6, 2004.
 MSN "Featured Download" on February 19, 2005.
 SmartComputing magazine's "November 2007 Smart Choice Award".

Sister product 
CoolSpeech has a sister product TextSound, which specializes in enhanced capabilities to batch convert text files into audio files, for users who need to produce spoken audio files in large volumes.

See also 
 Speech synthesis
 Microsoft Speech API

References

External links 
 

Windows-only shareware
Speech synthesis software
2001 software